The 2006 Super 14 season started on 10 February 2006. The Grand Final was held on 27 May 2006. Super 14 is a provincial rugby union competition with 14 teams from New Zealand, Australia and South Africa. This season was the first of the expansion, which saw two new teams, the Western Force and the Cheetahs, join the Super 12/14. The addition of two new teams led to the name change from the Super 12. It was also the first year for a new Super 14 trophy.

At the start of round one, the Crusaders were the favourite to win this year's title 1 with a return of A$3.25 for every $1 bet. The Blues were second favourite with a return of A$4.75 for every $1 bet and the Waratahs were third with a return of A$5.00 for every $1 bet. The Cats were favourites for the wooden spoon. These figures are the final odds.

The season saw the first joint commercial by the three SANZAR unions since 1996. The commercial was filmed in Ukraine and is set in a laundromat. The ad was attempting to draw interest, with the motto More teams, more games and more excitement at the end of the commercial. One player from each of the 14 teams was present, except for the Waratahs. A local extra named "Ouri" filled the role of Mat Rogers who injured his back in a test match for the Wallabies against .

By the end of round twelve, critics began speculating that the pre-season favourites, the Crusaders, were losing their form after a draw against the winless Western Force and then a shock loss to the Stormers. However they bounced back against the Bulls with a four-try bonus point victory. After a few results fell in their favour they were able to comfortably beat the Brumbies, and finished for the second consecutive season on top of the ladder. The Crusaders won the Super 14 after defeating the Hurricanes in Christchurch in the final, 19–12 in misty conditions. There was 94 matches held over three and a half months, with each team playing one full round robin against the 13 other teams and the playoffs involving two semi-finals and a final. Every team got one bye over the 14 rounds.

Table

South African relegation
Originally, the fifth-placed South African side was to be replaced by the Spears, who were initially planned to compete in the 2007 and 2008 competitions. However, the South African Rugby Union (SARU) revisited the decision to admit the Spears, and announced on 19 April 2006 that the Spears would not enter the competition.

On 5 August 2006, the High Court of South Africa threw a potential monkey wrench into the 2007 season when it issued its ruling in the Spears' legal challenge to the decision. It ruled that the Spears had a valid contract with SA Rugby, the commercial arm of SARU, to be included in the 2007 and 2008 Super 14. SA Rugby and SARU are expected to appeal the decision. If the Spears win their court challenge, the Lions, the new name for the Cats, will be relegated for 2007 and will play a test match with the lowest South African team on the 2007 ladder, other than the Spears, for a place in the 2008 competition.

On 8 September 2006, the Golden Lions Rugby Union, the company that operates the Cats franchise, announced that the franchise would be known in the future as the Lions.

Results

Round 1

Round 2

Round 3

Round 4

Round 5

Round 6

Round 7

Round 8

Round 9

Round 10

Round 11

Round 12

Round 13

Round 14

Finals

Semi finals

Grand final

Player statistics

Leading try scorers

Leading point scorers

References

 
2006
 
 
 
2006 rugby union tournaments for clubs